This is an incomplete list of paintings by the French painter Paul Gauguin.


Overview
Paul Gauguin (1848–1903) was a leading 19th-century Post-Impressionist artist, painter, sculptor, printmaker, ceramist and writer. His bold experimentation with color directly influenced modern art in the 20th century while his expression of the inherent meaning of the subjects in his paintings, under the influence of the cloisonnist style, paved the way to Primitivism and the return to the pastoral. He was also an influential proponent of wood engraving and woodcuts as art forms.

Timeline
1873–1884 Family life in Paris
1884 Family life in Rouen
1884 Family life in Copenhagen
1885 Dieppe, Paris
1886–1887 Artist's colony, Pont Aven, Brittany
1887 Trip to Martinique
1888 Pont Aven
1888 Staying with Van Gogh in Arles, Provençal
1889 Pont Aven
1891–1893 Trip to Tahiti
1894 Pont Aven
1895–1901 Living in Tahiti
1901–1903 Living at Hiva Oa, Marquesas Islands

List
 Titles in French and English were not necessarily given by Gauguin. Titles in Tahitian are those written on the paintings. Click on the image for more information about the painting.
  Column WIN indicates the Wildenstein Index Number (W. Georges/Daniel) and/or the Gabriele Mandel Sugana Index Number (S.)

1873–1885 (Paris, Rouen, Copenhagen)

1885–1886 (Dieppe, Paris)

1886-1891 (Brittany, Martinique, Provençal)

1891–1893 (Tahiti, Brittany)

1896–1903 (Tahiti, Marquesas Islands)

References

External links

Gauguin